Pantyffordd Halt railway station served the area of Pant-y-ffordd, in the historical county of Glamorgan, Wales, from 1929 to 1962 on the Neath and Brecon Railway.

History
The station was opened on 2 September 1929 by the Great Western Railway. It closed on 15 October 1962.

References

Disused railway stations in Flintshire
Former Great Western Railway stations
Railway stations in Great Britain opened in 1929
Railway stations in Great Britain closed in 1962
1929 establishments in Wales
1962 disestablishments in Wales